Mū tōrere is a two-player board game played mainly by Māori people from New Zealand's North Island. Each player has four counters. The game has a simple premise but expert players are able to see up to 40 moves ahead. Like many other Māori board games, it is played on a papa tākoro (game board) and is tightly interwoven with stories and histories.

The Ngāti Hauā chief Wiremu Tamihana Te Waharoa reputedly offered a game to Governor George Grey with the whole country going to the winner, but Grey declined, possibly because Māori players of mū tōrere had been known to win large sums from pākehā visitors to New Zealand who were new to the game.

Gameboard
The board is in the form of an eight-pointed star with endpoints, called kewai, connected to the center point, or pūtahi. The lines connecting the kewai to the pūtahi are oriented at 45 degrees.

Rules
Each player controls four counters, or perepere, which are initially placed on the board at the kewai. At the beginning of the game the  pūtahi is empty. (See illustration.)

Players move one of their counters per turn to an empty point. Players can move only to an adjacent kewai, and can move to the pūtahi only when the moved counter is adjacent to an opponent's counter. The player who blocks all the opponent's counters from moving is the winner.

Analysis
Mū tōrere has 1180 reachable positions. Out of those, 208 are winning, 128 are losing, and 844 are draws. The initial position is a draw.

References

Bibliography

Further reading

External links
 The board game of Mu Torere New Zealand in History
 Mu Torere  Big Computer Games

Traditional board games
Māori sport